Tang-e Darab-e Rika (also Romanized as Tang-e Dārāb-e Rīkā; also known as Tang-e Dārā) is a village in Kuhdasht-e Jonubi Rural District, in the Central District of Kuhdasht County, Lorestan Province, Iran. At the 2006 census, its population was 448, in 91 families.

References 

Towns and villages in Kuhdasht County